Cycling at the 2011 Games of the Small States of Europe  was held from 31 May – 3 June 2011.

Medal summary

Road Race

Time Trial

Mountain Bike

Medal table

References
Cycling Site of the 2011 Games of the Small States of Europe

2011 in road cycling
2011 Games of the Small States of Europe
2011
2011 in cycle racing
2011 in mountain biking